Kainulainen is a Finnish surname. Notable people with the surname include:

 Heikki Kainulainen (1917–2005), Finnish farmer and politician
 Markus Kainulainen (1922–2017), Finnish politician
 Jari Kainulainen (born 1970), Finnish bass guitarist

Finnish-language surnames